Oskar Bolza  (12 May 1857 – 5 July 1942) was a German mathematician, and student of Felix Klein. He was born in Bad Bergzabern, Palatinate, then a district of Bavaria, known for his research in the calculus of variations, particularly influenced by Karl Weierstrass' 1879 lectures on the subject.

Life

Bolza entered the University of Berlin in 1875. His first interest was in linguistics, then he studied physics with Kirchhoff and Helmholtz, but experimental work did not attract him, so he decided on mathematics in 1878. The years 1878–1881 were spent studying under Elwin Christoffel and Theodor Reye at Strasbourg, Hermann Schwarz at Göttingen, and particularly Karl Weierstrass in Berlin.

In the spring of 1888 he landed in Hoboken, NJ, searching for a job in the United States: he succeeded in finding a position in 1889 at Johns Hopkins University and then at the then newly founded Clark University. In 1892 Bolza joined the University of Chicago and worked there up to 1910 when, after becoming unhappy in the United States as a consequence of the death of his friend Heinrich Maschke in 1908, he and his wife returned to Freiburg in Germany. The events of World War I greatly affected Bolza and, after 1914, he stopped his research in mathematics. He became interested in religious psychology, languages (particularly Sanskrit), and Indian religions. He published the book Glaubenlose Religion (religion without belief) in 1930 under the pseudonym F. H. Marneck. However, later in his life, he returned to do research in mathematics, lecturing at University of Freiburg from 1929 up to his retirement in 1933.

Academic career
He completed his doctoral studies, after eight years of study and many changes of direction, in 1886, from the Georg-August-Universität Göttingen. He wrote his thesis, titled Über die Reduction hyperelliptischer Integrale erster Ordnung und erster Gattung auf elliptische, insbesondere über die Reduction durch eine Transformation vierten Grades (translated as On reduction of hyperelliptic integrals of first order and first kind to elliptic integrals, especially on reduction by transformation of fourth-degree) under the supervision of Felix Klein.

In 1889 Bolza worked at Johns Hopkins University, where Simon Newcomb gave him a temporary short-term appointment "reader in mathematics", then he obtained a position as an associate professor at Clark University. While at Clark, Bolza published the important paper On the theory of substitution groups and its application to algebraic equations in the American Journal of Mathematics. In 1892 Bolza joined the University of Chicago and worked there up to 1910, when he decided to return to Freiburg in Germany: he was appointed there as honorary professor, while the University Chicago awarded him the title of "non-resident professor of mathematics" which he retained for the rest of his life.

Work

Research activity
Bolza published The elliptic s-functions considered as a special case of the hyperelliptic s-functions in 1900 which related to work he had been studying for his doctorate under Klein. However, he worked on the calculus of variations from 1901. Papers which appeared in the Transactions of the American Mathematical Society over the next few years were: New proof of a theorem of Osgood's in the calculus of variations (1901); Proof of the sufficiency of Jacobi's condition for a permanent sign of the second variation in the so-called isoperimetric problems (1902); Weierstrass' theorem and Kneser's theorem on transversals for the most general case of an extremum of a simple definite integral (1906); and Existence proof for a field of extremals tangent to a given curve (1907). His text Lectures on the Calculus of Variations published by the University of Chicago Press in 1904, became a classic in its field and was republished several times: the augmented German edition of the same work was considered by his former student Gilbert Ames Bliss "a classic, indispensable to every scholar in the field, and much wider in its scope than his earlier book".

Immediately after his return to Germany Bolza continued teaching and research, in particular on function theory, integral equations and the calculus of variations. Two papers of 1913 and 1914 are particularly important. The first Problem mit gemischten Bedingungen und variablen Endpunkten formulated a new type of variational problem now called "the Bolza problem of Bolza" after him and the second studied variations for an integral problem involving inequalities. This latter work was to become important in control theory. Bolza returned to Chicago for part of 1913 giving lecturers during the summer on function theory and integral equations.

Teaching activity
Bolza joined the University of Chicago in 1892. Working eighteen years between 1892 and 1910. During this time the mathematics department was outstandingly successful with thirty-nine students graduating with doctorates (nine of them students of Bolza). These included Leonard Dickson, who was the first to be awarded a Ph.D. in mathematics by the University of Chicago, Gilbert Bliss, Oswald Veblen, Robert Lee Moore, George D. Birkhoff, and T. H. Hildebrandt.

In 1908 Bolza moved into Freiburg and managed to become a professor at the University of Freiburg and lectured there for years. However, his teachings were interrupted by World War I afterword he continued lecturing at Freiburg until 1926. After three years he returned to the University of Freiburg to continue lecturing he kept up his classes until 1933.

Selected publications
.
. The "revised and notably augmented German edition" of the classical work .

See also
Bolza surface

Notes

Biographical references
.
, available from Project Euclid.
, available from GDZ or from the DigiZeitschriften Document Server.
.

References

External links
Bolza's geometry.net profile

Clark University faculty
1857 births
1942 deaths
People from Bad Bergzabern
19th-century German mathematicians
20th-century German mathematicians
Geometers
University of Chicago faculty
People from the Palatinate (region)
Variational analysts